Berwick is an English and Scottish surname, originating from the places of Berwick-upon-Tweed on the English-Scottish border, Berwick, Kent, Berwick, Shropshire, Berrick, Oxfordshire, Barwick, Norfolk and Barwick, Yorkshire.

Notables with this name include
Andrew Berwick, anglicised pseudonym of Norwegian Murderer Anders Behring Breivik
Baron Berwick, a title
Berwick (cricketer) (first name unknown)
Dennison Berwick (born 1956), author
Donald Berwick (born 1947), American professor of pediatrics and health care policy
Duke of Berwick, a title in the Peerage of England
Eleanor Berwick (born 1943), English wine-grower
Harry Berwick (1923–1988), Australian golfer
James FitzJames, 1st Duke of Berwick (1670–1734)
Jeff Berwick (born 1970), Canadian businessperson and adventurer
Kester Berwick (1903–1992), Australian actor, playwright, and author
Nicola Berwick, (born in 1978) stunt actress
Stephan Berwick (born 1964), American author, martial artist, and actor
William Berwick (footballer) (1884–1948), English footballer
William Edward Hodgson Berwick (1888–1944), English mathematician

References

English toponymic surnames
English-language surnames